The Lafayette Parish School System (LPSS) or Lafayette Parish School Board (LPSB) is a school district based in Lafayette, Louisiana.

The district serves all of Lafayette Parish.

Board Members
As of October 2022, the school board consists of 9 members:
 District One: Mary Morrison
 District Two: Tommy Angelle
 District Three: Elroy Broussard
 District Four: Tehmi Chassion
 District Five: Britt Latiolais
 District Six: Justin Centanni
 District Seven: Kate Bailey Labue
 District Eight: Hannah Smith Mason
 District Nine: Don Aguillard

Gifted & Talented Program
The Gifted & Talented Program is a program designed for academically advanced students.  The elementary academic acceleration portion of the program occurs at Woodvale Elementary (full time), the middle school portion at 5th grade at LJ Alleman (full time) and Paul Breaux Middle School (full time), pull out program at Edgar Martin for middle school, and the high school portion at Lafayette High School (full time and pull out).

Schools Of Choice Program
Lafayette Parish School System currently offers sixteen Schools of Choice from grades K-12. These include the following:
 Elementary School Programs
 Arts & Technology (J. Wallace James)
 Environmental Sciences (L. Leo Judice)
 International Baccalaureate and Project Bright IDEA (J. W. Faulk)
 World Languages Immersion Academy
 French (Evangeline, Myrtle Place, Prairie)
 Mandarin Chinese (Corporal Michael Middlebrooks)
 Spanish (Alice Boucher)

 Middle School Academies
 Arts Academy (L. J. Alleman)
 Biomedical Academy (Carencro Middle)
 Environmental Sciences Academy (Lafayette Middle)
 World Languages Immersion Academy (Paul Breaux)

 High School Academies
 Health Academy (Lafayette High School)
 Academy of Business & Finance (Acadiana High School)
 Academy of Engineering (Northside High School & David Thibodaux STEM Magnet Academy)
 Academy of Information Technology - AOIT (Carencro High School)
 Academy of Legal Studies (Northside High School)
 Academy of Visual & Applied Arts (Comeaux High School)
 David Thibodaux STEM Magnet Academy 
 Early College Academy
l)

Each one offers something different. A student can get into a school of choice one of two ways; by lottery drawing, or application into the school of choice if slots remain after the lottery takes place. The lottery drawing is conducted in the last week of February, unless holidays interfere. There are no requirements for the Schools of Choice except for the Early College Academy. Each program has its own capacity for students. If the student is not accepted, then the legal guardian must enroll them in a home zoned school.

Fall Frenzy
Fall Frenzy is a day in the fall, usually in November, when any student that is zoned for a Lafayette Parish school may come to the convention center to explore the academies. Students can get information about a School of Choice, and learn about the daily activities. Parents can also get information about any prerequisites that the academy may have. Each School of Choice sets up a booth that displays graphics, etc. Each student can stop at a booth and learn about that specific School of Choice.

References

External links

Lafayette Parish School System

School districts in Louisiana
Education in Lafayette, Louisiana
Education in Lafayette Parish, Louisiana